Eric Stenman is an American record producer/engineer/mixer currently living in the Los Angeles area. Eric has recorded projects with artists including AWOLNATION, Thrice, Saves The Day, Senses Fail, Deftones, Gameface, M.I.A., Will Haven, Lovedrug, Tokyo Police Club, Far, Irontom,  Dashboard Confessional,  and many others.

Eric Stenman grew up in Sacramento, CA and got his start playing guitar and/or bass in bands like Tinfed, Elegy, and Bureau of the Glorious. Eric engineered his first sessions at John Baccigaluppi's (of TapeOp Magazine) Enharmonik Studios.

From 2007 to 2017, Eric was the Studio Manager/Chief Engineer at Red Bull Studios – Los Angeles. From 2017 to the present, Eric has overseen AWOLNATION's recording studio in Malibu, California.

Discography

2021
Earth Crisis, Snapcase, & Strife - The Return Of The California Takeover - WAR Records (2021) - Producer, Engineer, Mixer
Grace McKagan - One You Love - (2021) - Mixer

2020
AWOLNATION - Angel Miners & The Lightning Riders - Better Noise Records (2020) - Mixer, Engineer
Flawes - Highlights - Red Bull Records (2020) - Mixer
Horseneck - Fever Dream - (2020) - Mixer, Mastering
The Score - Carry On - Republic Records (2020) - Engineer

2019
The Frights - Live At The Obervatory - Epitaph Records (2019) - Mixer, Engineer
Blaqk Audio - Only Things We Love - Kobalt Music Group (2019) - Mixer
Death Valley High - Duel - minusHEAD Records (2019) - Additional Production, Mixer, Engineer
Gameface – IOU1 –  Revelation Records (2019) –  Producer, Mixer, Engineer

2018
Awolnation – Here Come The Runts – (2018) – Red Bull Records (2015) – Mixer, Engineer

2017
Irontom – Partners – Another Century Records (2017) – Mixer, Engineer
Daniel Caesar – Freudian – Golden Child Records (2016) – Engineer  ** (GRAMMY NOMINATED - Best R&B Album)
Jeff Caudill – Reset The Sun –  Revelation Records (2017) –  Mixer, Engineer
The Aces – I Don't Lke Being Honest – Red Bull Records (2017) – Mixer
Petyr – Petyr – Outer Battery Records (2017) – Mixer, Engineer
Kali Uchis – "Tyrant" – Virgin/EMI Records (2017) – Engineer
Daniel Brandt – Eternal Something – Erased Tapes Records (2017) – Engineer

2016

 Warm Brew – Diagnosis – Red Bull Records (2016) – Engineer
Daniel Caesar Featuring Kali Uchis – "Get You" – Golden Child Records (2016) – Engineer  ** (GRAMMY NOMINATED - Best R&B Performance)

2015
Awolnation – RUN – (2015) – Red Bull Records (2015) – Mixer, Engineer
Fifty Shades of Grey: Original Motion Picture Soundtrack – (2015) – Mixer, Engineer
Senses Fail – Pull The Thorns From Your Heart – Pure Noise Records (2015) – Mixing, Engineering
Yacht –  I Thought The Future Would Be Cooler –  Downtown Records (2015) –  Engineer

2014
††† Crosses – ††† – Sumerian Records (2014) – Mix Engineer
Gameface – Now Is What Matters Now –  Equal Vision Records (2014) –  Producer, Mixer, Engineer
Twin Forks – Twin Forks – Dine Alone Records (2014) – Mastering

2013
 Senses Fail – Renacer – Workhorse Music/Vagrant Records (2013) – Mixing, Engineering
 Iron Man 3: Heroes Fall – Music Inspired by the Motion Picture – Hollywood Records (2013) – Mixing, Engineering
 Injustice: Gods Among Us – The Album – WaterTower Music (2013) – Mixing, Engineering
 UZ – Balltrap Muzic Vol. 1 – Topshelf x Bloodcompany (2013) – Engineering, Mastering
 Party Supplies – Tough Love – Fool's Gold Records (2013) – Engineering

2012
 Thrice – Anthology – Workhorse Music/Vagrant Records (2012) – Mixing, Mastering
 Edward Sharpe & The Magnetic Zeros – One Love To Another Single – (2012) – Vagrant Records – Mastering
 Frankenweenie Unleashed! – Original Soundtrack – Walt Disney Records (2012) – Engineer, Mixer
 Your Favorite Trainwreck – Your Favorite Trainwreck –  (2012) Revelation Records – Producer, Mixer, Engineer
 School Of Seven Bells – Kiss Them For Me Single – (2012) Vagrant Records (2012) – Mastering
 Boys Like Girls – Crazy World E.P. – Columbia Records (2012) – 2nd Engineer, Digital Editing
 Brodka – LAX – Kayax (2012) – Engineer

2011
Awolnation – Megalithic Symphony – (2011) – Red Bull Records – Co-Producer, Mixer, Engineer, Composer
Tokyo Police Club – 10x10x10 – (2011) – Mom + Pop Music – Producer, Mixer, Engineer
††† Crosses – EP 1 – (2011) – Mix Engineer
††† Crosses – EP 2 – (2011) – Mix Engineer
Batman: Arkham City – The Album – Original Soundtrack – (2011) Warner Brothers – Mix Engineer
Innerpartysystem – Never Be Content – (2011) – Red Bull Records – Engineer
Thrice – Major/Minor – (2011) – Vagrant Records – 2nd Engineer
Death Valley High – Doom, In Full Bloom – Minus Head Records (2011) – Mixer (Days & Days, The Wait, Bring It Down, I Kissed A Girl)

2010
M.I.A. – MAYA – (2010) – N.E.E.T./XL/Interscope – Engineer
Far – At Night We Live – (2010) – Vagrant Records – Engineer
Weezer – Hurley – (2010) – Epitaph Records – Assistant Engineer
Katy Perry – Teenage Dream - Australia Deluxe Edition – (2010) – EMI Music – Engineer
Keyshia Cole – Calling All Hearts – (2010) – Geffen Records – Engineer
 Eightfourseven – Lossless – (2010) – Minus Head Records – Producer, Engineer, Mixer
Earl Greyhound – Suspicious Package – (2010) – Engineer
Stereo Skyline – Stuck On Repeat – (2010) – Columbia Records – Engineer
Envy On The Coast – Low Country – (2010) – Photo Finish Records – Assistant Engineer
The Tank – We Were Lost – (2010) – Glass Presser/Bullion Records – Producer, Mixer, Engineer

2009
Twin Atlantic – Vivarium – (2009) – Red Bull Records – Mixer, Additional Production and Engineering
Armed For Apocalypse – Defeat – (2009) – Ironclad Recordings – Mixing
We The Kings – Smile Kid – (2009) – S-Curve Records – Engineer
Olivia Broadfield – Eyes Wide Open – (2009) – Vagrant Records – Mixing, Mastering
Two Tongues – Two Tongues – (2009) – Vagrant Records – Mastering
3OH!3 – Want (Deluxe Edition) – (2009) Atlantic/Photo Finish Records – Engineer
School Boy Humor – School Boy Humor – (2009) – Vagrant Records – Mixing, Mastering
Desario – Zero Point Zero – (2009) – Darla Records – Mixing, Mastering

2008
Thrice – MySpace: Transmissions Session – (2008) – Engineer, Mixer
Lovedrug – The Suckerpunch Show – (2008) – The Militia Group – Engineer
Bayside – Shudder –  (2008) – Victory Records – Engineer
Red Car Wire – Let's Never Get Older – (2008) – Universal Records – Mixer
Forever The Sickest Kids – Underdog Alma Mater – (2008) – Universal Records – Engineer
From Autumn To Ashes – Live At Looney Tunes – (2008) – Vagrant Records – Mastering
Augustana – Live/Acoustic: Exclusive Tracks for iTunes – (2008) – Epic Records – Mixing, Mastering
The Anniversary – Devil On Our Side: Rarities & B-Sides – (2008) – Vagrant Records – Mastering
The Cab – Whisper War – (2008) – Fueled By Ramen Records – Engineer
Thrice – Come All Ye Weary E.P. – (2008) – Vagrant Records – Mastering

2007
Saves The Day – Under The Boards – (2007) – Vagrant Records – Producer, Mixer, Engineer
The Comas – Spells – Vagrant Records (2007) – Mixer, Additional Engineering
Dashboard Confessional – Dusk And Summer (Deluxe Edition) – (2007) – Vagrant/Interscope Records – Mixer
Hellogoodbye – Live Performance Tracks for MTV and B-Sides – (2007) – Drive Thru Records – Mixer
The Bled – "Asleep on The Frontlines (Appliantz Remix)" – Resident Evil: Extinction – *Original Soundtrack – Lakeshore Records (2007) – Remix, Additional Production, Bass Guitar
The Hold Steady – Live At Fingerprints – Vagrant Records (2007) – Mastering
Death Valley High – The Similarities of the Loveless and the Undead – Attinuator Records (2007) – Producer, Engineer, Mixer, Bass Guitar

2006
Dashboard Confessional – AOL Session – (2006) – Mixer
Dashboard Confessional – FUSE 7th Ave Drop – First aired on 6/27/06 – Mixer
Senses Fail – Still Searching (Deluxe Edition) – Vagrant Records (2006) – Producer, Engineer, Mixer
Good Charlotte – 2006 Demos – Epic Records (2006) – Engineer, Mixer
Saves The Day – Bug Sessions: Volume One – (2006) – Producer, Mixer, Engineer
Say Anything (Featuring Chris Conley) – Paupers Peasants Princes and *Kings: The Songs of Bob Dylan – Doghouse Records (2006) – Mixer
The Abominable Iron Sloth – Self Titled – Goodfellow Records (2006) – Mixer, Mastering
dios (malos)  – Album EP – Startime International Records (2006) – Mastering
Eightfourseven – Silent Raid – (2006) – Producer, Mixer, Engineer

2005
Deftones – B-Sides & Rarities – Maverick Records (2005) – Producer, Mixer, Engineer
Senses Fail – Let It Enfold You (Deluxe Edition) – Vagrant Records (2005) – Mixer
Saves The Day – Tony Hawk: American Wasteland Soundtrack – Vagrant Records (2005) – producer, Mixer, Engineer
Senses Fail – Taste Of Chaos: Live – Image Entertainment (2005) – Mixer
California Oranges – Souvenirs – Darla Records (2005) – Mixer

2004
Ghostride – Cobra Sunrise – Distruktor Records/Golf Records/Plastichead (2004) – Producer, Mixer, Engineer
Training for Utopia – Technical Difficulties – Tooth & Nail Records (2004) – Producer, Engineer, Mixer

2003
Gameface – Four To Go – Doghouse Records (2003) – Producer, Engineer, Mixer
Leisure – Leisure  – DreamWorks Records (2003) – Producer, Mixer, Engineer
Ghostride – Ghostride E.P. – Distruktor Records (2003) – Producer, Mixer, Engineer
No Motiv – Lola E.P. – Vagrant Records (2003) – Mastering
Folk Implosion – "Leaving It Up To Me – Radio Edit" – iMusic (2003) – Editing, Mastering
California Oranges – Oranges & Pineapples – Darla Records (2003) – Producer, Mixer, Engineer
MC Lyte – "Ride Wit Me" EA Sports Mix – iMusic (2003) – Mixer, Engineer

2002
Fall Silent – Drunken Violence – Revelation Records (2002) – Producer, Mixer, Engineer
Tinfed – Designated Rivals – Attinuator Records (2002) – Producer, Engineer, Mixer, Remixer

2001
Will Haven – Carpe Diem – Revelation Records/Music For Nations (2001) – Producer, Mixer, Engineer

2000
Tinfed – Tried + True – Third Rail/Hollywood Records (2000) – Guitar, Bass
Original Soundtrack – Mission: Impossible 2 – Hollywood Records (2000) – Guitar, Bass
Flashpoint – On the Verge – Atomic Pop Records (2000) – Producer, Engineer, Mixer
The Revolution Smile – At War With Plastic – Animation Records (2000) – Engineer

1999
Far – "Monkey Gone to Heaven" – Glue Factory Records (1999) – Producer, Mixer, Engineer
Luscious Jackson "Nervous Breakthrough (Remix) " Grand Royal Records (1999) – Remixer, Guitar
Will Haven – WHVN – Revelation Records/Music For Nations (1999) – Producer, Programming, Engineer
Countervail – The Most Abused Word – New Age Records (1999) – Producer, Mixer, Engineer
Percy Howard, Vernon Reid, & Trey Gunn – Incidental Seductions – Materiali Sonori Records (1999) – Engineer
The Tank – There's No "I" In Band – Dr. Strange Records (1999) – Producer, Mixer, Engineer
Training for Utopia – Throwing a Wrench... – Tooth & Nail Records (1999) – Producer, Engineer, Mixer

1998
Skinny Puppy – Remix Dys Temper – Nettwerk Records (1998) – Guitar, Remixer
Training for Utopia & Zao – Split [EP] – Tooth & Nail Records (1998) – Producer, Mixer, Engineer
Amber Inn – All Roads Lead Home – Ebullition Records (1998) – Producer, Mixer, Engineer

1997
Far (with Deftones) – Soon – Immortal/Epic Records (1997) – Producer, Mixer, Engineer
Far – "All Go Down" – Original Soundtrack – God Money – V2 Records (1997) – Producer, Mixer, Engineer
Knapsack – "Less Than" – Don't Forget to Breathe – Crank Records (1997) – Producer, Mixer, Engineer
Will Haven – El Diablo – Revelation Records (1997) Producer, Engineer, Mixer

1996
Far – Tin Cans with Strings to You – Immortal/Epic Records (1996) – Engineer
Tinfed – Hypersonic Hyperphonic – Cargo Records (1996) – Bass, Programming, Producer, Engineer, Mixer
Zoinks! – Stranger Anxiety – Dr. Strange Records (1996) – Producer, Engineer, Mixer
Boneback – "Starsky Solo Project" – Coffee Records- (1996) – Producer, Mixer Engineer

1995
7 Seconds – The Music, The Message – Immortal/Epic Records (1995) – Mixer, Engineer
Vomit Launch – Not Even Pretty – Teenbeat Records (1995) Mixer, Mastering

1994
Far – In The Isle, Yelling 7"; Rusty Nail Records (1994) – Producer, Mixer, Engineer

1993
Tinfed – Synaptic Hardware – Primitech Releases (1993) – Producer, Engineer, Mixer

Sources
 Eric Stenman's official site
 https://tapeop.com/articles/by/eric-stenman
 Awolnation.com
 Allmusic.com
 Discogs.com
 Artistdirect.com

External links
 Eric Stenman's official site
 Red Bull Studios

Record producers from California
American audio engineers
Mixing engineers
Living people
Year of birth missing (living people)